Voodoo-Murders (stylised in all capital letters), or more simply as VDM, is a professional wrestling stable and the main heel group in All Japan Pro Wrestling between 2005 and 2011. In 2013, the group was reformed in Diamond Ring. They perform violent actions and display a lack of respect for their opponents.

History

2005–2007
After competing in All Japan Pro Wrestling briefly in the early 2000s, Taru returned to All Japan on January 3, 2005, teaming with Johnny Stamboli to defeat David Flair and Keiji Mutoh. The duo was later joined by Chuck Palumbo, Shuji Kondo, "brother" Yasshi and briefly Giant Bernard; proclaiming themselves as Voodoo-Murders with Taru as their leader. Although the phrase Voodoo Murders is thought to be Engrish by some fans, it seems to be a tribute to a pulp magazine called "The Voodoo Murders." Taru drastically changed his yakuza inspired gimmick from Toryumon into a more bizarre, sinister cult leader of Voodoo-Murders. VDM would regularly employ illegal tactics and weapons into their matches, and often opted to lose via disqualification in order to beat down their opponents.

VDM quickly began feuding with the former top heel stable of All Japan RO&D which lasted for over a year. On June 19, Kondo and Yasshi won the vacant All Asia Tag Team Champions by defeating Tomoaki Honma and Katsuhiko Nakajima. Their title reign would be brief however, as they lost the titles to Nakajima and Kensuke Sasaki on July 26. Kondo bounced back quickly, winning the World Junior Heavyweight Championship from RO&D leader Taka Michinoku on October 22. On January 8, 2006, Taru unsuccessfully challenged Satoshi Kojima for the Triple Crown Heavyweight Championship. Following the match, Kohei Suwama aligned himself with VDM, changing his name to Suwama. Later in the year, RO'Z defected from RO&D to VDM. On September 17, VDM finally destroyed RO&D when Taru, Suwama, RO'Z and Yasshi defeated Buchanan, D'Lo Brown, Taiyō Kea and Michinoku after Buchanan and D'Lo Brown turned on RO&D and joined VDM.

At New Japan Pro-Wrestling's Wrestle Kingdom I, Taru, Suwama, RO'Z and former VDM member Giant Bernard defeated Manabu Nakanishi, Naofumi Yamamoto, Riki Choshu and Takashi Iizuka. On February 17, 2007, Kondo lost his World Junior Heavyweight Championship to Katsuhiko Nakajima. On June 24, after months of Taru attempting to recruit him, Satoshi Kojima finally joined the Voodoo Murders; following the main event match pitting Kondo against Nakajima, the group attacked Nakajima and Sasaki, but were aided when Kojima jumped off the turnbuckle and attacked Sasaki. The group continued to beat down Sasaki and everyone that attempted to help him, including Keiji Mutoh. On August 26, Suwama teamed up with Total Nonstop Action Wrestling star Scott Steiner in a losing effort to The Great Muta and Tajiri. At the same event, Taru and Kojima won the World Tag Team Championships from Taiyo Kea and Toshiaki Kawada. By the end of the year Zodiac had joined VDM, whilst Suwama was experiencing problems with the rest of the group.

2008
On January 3, 2008, Taru and Kojima lost the World Tag Team Championships to Keiji Mutoh and Joe Doering. At the same show, Suwama finally broke away from Voodoo Murders and returned the All Japan Seikigun. On March 1, Taru lost to Suwama whilst Kojima unsuccessfully challenged Kensuke Sasaki for the Triple Crown Championship. In the immediate aftermath, the group entered a slump as Kojima took time off due to injuries. The group also add Al Daivari and World Junior Heavyweight Champion Silver King. On April 29, Silver King lost his title to Ryuji Hijikata, and both new members leaving by the summer.

Things continued to get worse as Kojima returned from injury and decided to form his own stable with KAI and Hiroshi Yamato Later, Shuji Kondo also decided to leave the group and return to the All Japan Seikigun. Despite these setbacks, Taru would rebuild and in the fall, recruited top gaijin Joe Doering and veteran wrestler Nobukazu Hirai. Doering would team up with Zodiac as the Voodoo Towers, whilst Hirai was renamed to Hate.

2009
In February 2009, "brother" Yasshi left All Japan whilst Lance Hoyt, Michael Faith and former New Japan wrestler Minoru joined VDM. On March 1, Ryuji Hijikata turned on his partner Kaz Hayashi, joining VDM and returning to his masked persona Toshizo. In the spring, Minoru and Toshizo won the 2009 Junior Tag League and would go on and win the tournament, both also received shots at the Jr. Title against Kaz Hayashi but both failed to win the title. Throughout the year, there was dissension in the group as Zodiac was having issues with Taru. In September, Zodiac defected to Satoshi Kojima's F4 stable.

After Zodiac's departure, the group would have a slump for the rest of the year as they lost to F4 in a Captain's Fall Elimination Match on September 23, 2009, Taru and Doering then failed to win the All Asia Tag Team Championship on October 24, Hate failed to win the Jr. Heavyweight Title on October 25, and Taru and Doering placed last at the World's Strongest Tag Determination League due to Doering suffering from the flu.

2010

VDM's issues continued in 2010, with Doering leaving for the WWE. Despite the loss, VDM would go on to have one of its most successful years. They quickly replaced Doering with René Duprée and, on February 7, forced F4 to disband after defeating them in a Captain's Fall Elimination match. Continuing the success, VDM would recruit Big Daddy Voodoo and, on April 29, Taru teamed up with him to win the All Asia Tag Team Championships from Akebono and Ryota Hama. In the coming months, VDM also recruited Lance Cade, Mazada and Kenso. On August 13, tragedy struck when Lance Cade died at the age of 29 of apparent heart failure in San Antonio, Texas. Toshizo left All Japan in the same month. On August 29 Taru and Big Daddy Voodoo lost the All-Asia Tag Team Championship to Manabu Soya and Seiya Sanada. On October 10, 2010, Hate lost a match to Shuji Kondo and as a result he must retire. Later in the show, Charlie Haas debuted for All Japan and joined the Voodoo Murders. In his debut match, Haas teamed with Taru and Big Daddy Voodoo to defeat Minoru Suzuki, Akebono, & Taiyo Kea. Afterwards, Masayuki Kono joined the Voodoo Murders after Kenso helped him defeat Ryota Hama, changing his name to simply Kono On December 7 Kenso and Kono defeated Hama and Suwama in the finals to win the 2010 World's Strongest Tag Determination League.

2011
On January 2, 2011, Minoru defeated Kaz Hayashi to win the World Junior Heavyweight Championship, ending Hayashi's 23-month reign. At the same show, Hate returned to the group now known as Super Hate. The following day, Kenso and Kono challenged Akebono and Taiyo Kea for the World Tag Team Championship but lost. Following the January 3rd Korakuen Hall show, Taru fired Kenso from the group. On May 29, 2011, Nobukazu Hirai (Super Hate) suffered a stroke after a backstage fight with Taru. In the aftermath of the event, All Japan suspended not only Taru, but also Kono, Minoru and Mazada for not attempting to stop the assault, disbanded Voodoo Murders and vacated the titles the stable held.

2013–present
After a nineteen-month break from professional wrestling, Taru returned to the ring on February 11, 2013, at a Diamond Ring event. His return match, where he and Kazunari Murakami faced Kento Miyahara and Taishi Takizawa, ended in a no contest, following run-ins from "brother" Yasshi and Kengo Nishimura. Afterwards, Taru, Murakami, Yasshi and Nishimura, reforming the Voodoo Murders, were defeated in an eight-man tag team match by Miyahara, Takizawa, Satoshi Kajiwara and Mitsuhiro Kitamiya. After the match, Miyahara and Takizawa turned on their partners and joined the new Voodoo Murders, with "brother" Yasshi positioned as the leader. Miyahara and the rest of Voodoo Murders announced an amicable split on November 14, 2013. Three days later, Yasshi, Nishimura and Taru made their debuts for Pro Wrestling Zero1, announcing that the Voodoo Murders were taking over the promotion. On February 11, 2014, Zero1 Vice President KAMIKAZE turned on the promotion and aligned his Daemon-gun stable, which also included Daemon Ueda and Takuya Sugawara, with the Voodoo Murders. On February 19 "brother" Yasshi formally announced that he is withdrawing from Voodoo Murders that he is more concentrated on wrestling Dragon Gate.

Members

Current
These members remain based in AJPW and ZERO1.

Former

Timeline

Sub-groups

Current

Championships and accomplishments
All Japan Pro Wrestling
Triple Crown Heavyweight Championship (1 time) – Suwama
All Asia Tag Team Championship (2 times) – Taru and Big Daddy Voodoo (1), Shuji Kondo and "brother" Yasshi (1), and Minoru and Toshizo (1)
Gaora TV Championship (1 time, current) – Toshizo
World Junior Heavyweight Championship (3 times) – Shuji Kondo (1), Silver King (1), Minoru (1)
World Tag Team Championship (2 times) – Taru and Satoshi Kojima (1), Joe Doering and Kono (1)
AJPW Junior Tag League (2009) – Minoru and Toshizo
January 2 Korakuen Hall Heavyweight Battle Royal (2009) – Zodiac
January 3 Korakuen Hall Junior Heavyweight Battle Royal (2006, 2007, 2009) – "brother" Yasshi
World's Strongest Tag Determination League (2010) – Kenso and Kono
Chō Hanabi Puroresu
Bakuha-ō Championship (3 times, current) – Taru (2, current) and Masato Tanaka (1)
Bakuha-ō Tag Team Championship (1 time, current) – Taru & Masato Tanaka
Pro Wrestling Zero1
NWA Intercontinental Tag Team Championship (3 times) – Taru and Hartley Jackson (1), Masato Tanaka and Yuji Hino (1), & Taru and Chris Vice (1)
NWA International Lightweight Tag Team Championship (2 times) – Takuya Sugawara and "brother" Yasshi
NWA United National Heavyweight Championship (1 time) – Shogun Okamoto
Zero1 World Heavyweight Championship (2 times) – Masato Tanaka
Tenkaichi Jr. (2016) – Takuya Sugawara
Fire Festival (2017) – Masato Tanaka
Tenryu Project
UWA World Junior Heavyweight Championship (1 time) – Kengo Nishimura
Tokyo Sports

Tag Team of the Year (2006) Taru, Suwama, Shuji Kondo and "brother" Yasshi

References

All Japan Pro Wrestling teams and stables
New Japan Pro-Wrestling teams and stables
Pro Wrestling Zero1 teams and stables